Diospyros squamifolia is a small tree in the family Ebenaceae. The specific epithet  is from the Latin meaning "scale-like leaf", referring to the fish scale shape of the leaves. Its habitat is lowland mixed dipterocarp forests. D. squamifolia is endemic to Borneo and known only from Sabah.

References

squamifolia
Endemic flora of Borneo
Trees of Borneo
Flora of Sabah
Plants described in 1977